Guayacán Orquesta is a Colombian salsa music band.

The band was founded by Alexis Lozano, formerly of Grupo Niche, trombone player and arranger, and includes Israel Tanenbaum, producer, pianist and arranger, and is one of the premier salsa bands in the music of Colombia. Ostual Serna is the current conga player.

Discography
 Llego La Hora De La Verdad (1985)
 Que La Sangre Alborota (1987)
Guayacan Es La Orquesta (1988)
La Mas Bella (1989)
5 Años Aferrados Al Sabor (1990)
Sentimental de Punta a Punta (1991)
Con el Corazon Abierto (1992)
A Verso y Golpe (1993)
Marcando La Differencia (1995)
Como En Un Baile (1995)
La Otra Cara (1996)
Con Sabor Tropical (1997)
Nadie Los Quita Lo Bailao (1998)
Xtremo (2005) 
Bueno y Mas (2009)
25 Años 25 Exitos 25 Artistas (2013)
Supernatural (2019)

References

Colombian salsa musical groups